Hubertus Castle (German: Schloß Hubertus) is an 1895 novel by the German writer Ludwig Ganghofer.

Adaptations
It has been adapted for the screen three times: 
 Hubertus Castle (1934) directed by Hans Deppe
 Hubertus Castle (1954) directed by Helmut Weiss
 Hubertus Castle (1973) directed by Harald Reinl

References

Bibliography
 Goble, Alan. The Complete Index to Literary Sources in Film. Walter de Gruyter, 1999.

1895 novels
19th-century German novels
Novels by Ludwig Ganghofer
German novels adapted into films

de:Schloß Hubertus